This is a list of films produced by the Tollywood film industry based in Hyderabad, Telangana in 1962.

External links
 Earliest Telugu language films at IMDb.com (357 to 378)

1962
Telugu
Telugu films